Bramhall South and Woodford is an electoral ward in the Metropolitan Borough of Stockport. It elects three councillors to Stockport Metropolitan Borough Council using the first-past-the-post electoral method, electing one councillor every year without election on the fourth.

The ward was created in 2004, from parts of the former wards of West Bramhall and Cheadle Hulme South. It covers the southern part of Bramhall, and has the main village centre located within it. To the south of the ward is Wilmslow and Handforth Dean.

Together with Bramhall North, Cheadle and Gatley, Cheadle Hulme North, Cheadle Hulme South, Heald Green and Stepping Hill wards it makes up the Cheadle Parliamentary Constituency.

In January 2015, it became home to the first ever UKIP representative to hold a political position in Stockport when Paul Bellis joined the party following his exit from the Conservatives. However, he failed to defend his seat from Conservative Party candidate Mike Hurleston in the subsequent election. Following the May 2022 local elections, Liberal Democrat councillor Ian Powney became the first non-Conservative representative to be elected by the ward.

Councillors
Bramhall South electoral ward is represented in Westminster by Mary Robinson MP for Cheadle.

The ward is represented on Stockport Council by three councillors: Ian Powney (Lib Dem), Mike Hurleston (Con), and Brian Bagnall (Con).

 indicates seat up for re-election.
 indicates seat won in by-election.
 indicates councillor defected.

Elections in 2020s

May 2022

May 2021

Elections in 2010s

May 2019

May 2018

May 2016

May 2015

November 2014 (by-election)

The by-election occurred due to the resignation of the incumbent Conservative Party candidate Anita Johnston due to ill health.

May 2014

May 2012

May 2011

May 2010

Elections in the 2000s

May 2008

May 2007

May 2006

May 2004

References

External links
Stockport Metropolitan Borough Council

Wards of the Metropolitan Borough of Stockport